Humfrey is a given name and surname. Notable people with the name include:

Given name
 Humfrey Malins (born 1945), British Conservative politician
 Humfry Payne (1902–1936), English archaeologist

Surname
 Chris Humfrey, Australian zoologist and television personality
 Pelham Humfrey (1647–1674), English Restoration composer
 William Humfrey (died 1579), goldsmith and Assay Master to Queen Elizabeth I of England

See also
 Humphery, surname
 Humphrey, given name and surname
 Humphry, given name and surname